Colors TV is an Indian general entertainment broadcast network owned by Viacom18. The network's programming consists of family dramas, comedies, youth-oriented reality shows, shows on crime and television films.

History
It was launched on 21 July 2008 by Viacom18 under then Chief Executive Officer Rajesh Kamat.

Reception
Over the years, series like Balika Vadhu, Uttaran, Bigg Boss, Fear Factor: Khatron Ke Khiladi, Sasural Simar Ka,  Naagin and Udaariyaan helped the channel to pass the decade-old market-leader StarPlus in weekly Gross Rating Points (GRPs).

Programming

Colors HD

Colors HD was added on 24 October 2011 by various MSO & DTH Operators in India and Nepal including Dish Home (Nepal), Asianet Digital TV, DishTV, Airtel digital TV, Videocon d2h and Tata Play. Hathway digital cable also provides Colors HD.

International
On 21 January 2010, Colors became available on Dish Network in the United States, Canada and Mexico, where it is called Aapka Colors (Your Colors) that gives English subtitles on every show and to avoid confusion with now-defunct Colours TV.Amitabh Bachchan served as brand ambassador for the UK and USA launches.
 
Colors launched in the United Kingdom and Ireland on Sky on 25 January 2010. On 9 December 2009, INX Media confirmed that Colors had bought 9XM's Sky EPG slot on channel 829 and on 5 January 2010, Colors secured a deal to join the ViewAsia subscription package. Initially the channel was available free-to-air and then subsequently was added to the ViewAsia package on 19 April 2010. Colors was added to Virgin Media on 1 April 2011, as a part of the Asian Mela pack. On 2 September 2013, Colors left the ViewAsia package and became free-to-air on satellite again, as well as moving to Virgin's basic package.

Golden Petal Awards
Golden Petal Awards is an award function to honour personalities a reward for their contribution to the Colors TV channel. It last happened in 2017 and is since defunct.

References

External links

 
 

Viacom 18
Hindi-language television stations
Television channels and stations established in 2008
Television stations in Mumbai
Hindi-language television channels in India
Network18 Group
2008 establishments in Maharashtra